Manfred von Knobelsdorff, Lieutenant Colonel Waffen-SS, (born 15 June 1892 in Berlin-Spandau, died 1965) oversaw much of Wewelsburg Castle from February 12, 1935, through January 24, 1938, where he presided over several ceremonies.  In 1938 Siegfried Taubert succeeded Knobelsdorff.

He is believed to have been a follower of Irminism.

His wife Ilse was the sister of Minister of Agriculture Walther Darré.

 07.02.1934 SS-Sturmführer
 09.11.1934 SS-Obersturmführer
 28.05.1935 SS-Hauptsturmführer
 29.01.1936 SS-Sturmbannführer
 24.01.1938 SS-Obersturmbannführer
 12.02.1935 - 24.01.1938 ”Burghauptmann von Wewelsburg” (SS-Ordensburg)

Sources
 Kirsten John-Stucke:Wewelsburg

1892 births
Nazi Party officials
Military personnel from Berlin
People from the Province of Brandenburg
SS-Obersturmbannführer
1965 deaths